Anatoly Ivanovich Shelyukhin (June 15, 1930 – October 21, 1995) was a Soviet cross-country skier who competed during the late 1950s and early 1960s, training at VSS Trud in Kostroma. He earned a bronze medal in the 4x10 km relay at the 1960 Winter Olympics in Squaw Valley. He won two medals at the 1958 Nordic skiing World Championships with a silver in the 4x10 km relay and a bronze in the 15 km. He was born in Kostroma.

References

Biography of Anatoly Shelyukhin 

1930 births
1995 deaths
People from Kostroma
Olympic cross-country skiers of the Soviet Union
Olympic bronze medalists for the Soviet Union
Soviet male cross-country skiers
Cross-country skiers at the 1960 Winter Olympics
Cross-country skiers at the 1956 Winter Olympics
Olympic medalists in cross-country skiing
FIS Nordic World Ski Championships medalists in cross-country skiing
Medalists at the 1960 Winter Olympics
Sportspeople from Kostroma Oblast